A Man Called Otto is a 2022 American comedy-drama film directed by Marc Forster from a screenplay by David Magee. It is the second film adaptation of the 2012 novel A Man Called Ove by Fredrik Backman after the 2015 Swedish film of the same name. The film stars Tom Hanks in the title role, with Mariana Treviño, Rachel Keller, and Manuel Garcia-Rulfo.

A Man Called Otto began a limited theatrical release on December 29, 2022, before a wide release in the United States on January 13, 2023. The film received generally favorable reviews from critics and has grossed $108 million worldwide on a $50 million budget.

Plot

Otto Anderson, a 63-year-old widower, lives in suburban Pittsburgh, Pennsylvania.  After retiring from a steel company, he plans suicide, having lost his wife Sonya, a schoolteacher, six months previously. 

During a suicide attempt by hanging, he is interrupted by his new neighbors: Marisol, Tommy, and their two daughters, Abby and Luna. Otto has flashbacks to his past; years previously he tried to enlist in the army but was rejected due to his hypertrophic cardiomyopathy. He meets Sonya on a train after returning a book she dropped.

Otto attempts suicide again, this time via carbon monoxide poisoning. He experiences a flashback to a dinner with Sonya, confessing to her that he is not enlisted in the army due to his heart condition and does not have a job, prompting Sonya to kiss him. Marisol disrupts Otto's suicide attempt, asking him to take her and her kids to the hospital after Tommy fell and broke his leg using a ladder Otto had lent to him. Otto reluctantly agrees. 

Otto has a flashback to his graduation when he asked Sonya to marry him. During a suicide attempt by train, an old man faints and falls on the railroad tracks. Otto saves the man and the incident goes viral. Otto takes Marisol for a driving lesson and they visit Sonya's favorite bakery, which the couple formerly frequented every weekend. There, he tells her about his friendship with a man named Reuben, the two having worked together to establish rules and order, with Otto as chairman of the neighborhood association board. The two grew apart after Reuben's preference for Fords and Toyotas over Otto's Chevrolets and the "coup" of replacing Otto as chairman. Reuben, who had a stroke, now uses a wheelchair and is cared for by his wife Anita and neighbor Jimmy. 

A local transgender teen, Malcolm, recognizes Otto as Sonya's husband while delivering newspapers and circulars in the neighborhood. Malcolm cuts through Otto's disgruntlement at receipt of the newspapers and recounts that Sonya was his teacher, and one of the few people who accepted him as he was. A friendship forms between the pair and Otto fixes Malcolm's bicycle. After dodging a social media journalist named Shari Kenzie who is attempting to interview Otto in relation to the earlier viral video, he gets angry at both Marisol and a Dye & Merika real estate agent, not wanting to come to terms with Sonya's death. He attempts to commit suicide by shotgun, but is interrupted by Malcolm, who asks to spend the night after his father kicked him out. 

Otto learns that Dye & Merika is planning to force Reuben into a nursing home and take their house, after illegally finding out that Anita was diagnosed with Parkinson's disease. Otto agrees to help Anita and Reuben. Marisol refuses to assist Otto until he tells her that he and Sonya went to Niagara Falls to celebrate Sonya's pregnancy. On the bus back home, they were involved in a crash, and Sonya became paralyzed and had a miscarriage. The neighborhood was not accessible to Sonya and Otto was voted out of the chairmanship after a heated confrontation with a Dye & Merika representative. Otto wanted to put all of the real estate companies out of business but decided against it to care for Sonya. With the help of the neighborhood and Shari Kenzie, Reuben and Anita are able to keep their home. 

Otto collapses and is taken to the hospital, where he lists Marisol as his next of kin. After being told by a cardiologist that Otto's heart is too big, she laughs, before going into labor and gives birth to a son.

One day, Tommy notices that Otto did not shovel the snow on his walkway. Marisol and Tommy enter Otto's house to find him dead, having succumbed to his enlarged heart. A funeral is held, attended by his neighbors. In a letter to Marisol, Otto says that his lawyer will give her his bank accounts, providing them with enough money to take care of her family, along with his new car and house.

Cast
 Tom Hanks as Otto Anderson
 Truman Hanks as young Otto Anderson
 Mariana Treviño as Marisol
 Rachel Keller as Sonya 
 Manuel Garcia-Rulfo as Tommy
 Cameron Britton as Jimmy
 Mack Bayda as Malcolm
 Juanita Jennings as Anita
 Emonie Ellison as young Anita
 Peter Lawson Jones as Reuben
 Laval Schley as young Reuben
 Christiana Montoya as Luna
 Alessandra Perez as Abby
 Mike Birbiglia as Real Estate Agent
 Kelly Lamor Wilson as Shari Kenzie 
 David Magee as Dye & Merika Rep '83
 John Higgins as Hardware Store Clerk

Marisol's baby was played by triplets local to the Pittsburgh area.

Production
In September 2017, it was announced that Tom Hanks would star in an English-language adaptation of the 2015 film A Man Called Ove, and would also produce alongside Playtone partner Gary Goetzman, Rita Wilson, and Fredrik Wikström Nicastro of SF Studios. Marc Forster was confirmed as the film's director in January 2022, with David Magee writing the screenplay.

Filming
Filming began in Pittsburgh, Pennsylvania in February 2022. It wrapped in May 2022.

Soundtrack
Thomas Newman composed the film's score. The soundtrack album was released by Decca Records on December 30, 2022. The album also features the single "Til You're Home" by Rita Wilson and Sebastián Yatra, which was released on December 2, 2022, and was shortlisted for the Academy Award for Best Original Song.

Release
The film began limited theatrical release in New York City and Los Angeles on December 29, 2022, before a wide release in the United States on January 13, 2023, by Sony Pictures Releasing. It was originally set for a wide release on December 25, 2022, then moved up to December 14, 2022, before moving to its current date.

Home media

The film was released for VOD on February 28, 2023. It was released for Blu-ray and DVD on March 14, 2023.

Reception

Box office
, A Man Called Otto has grossed $64 million in the United States and Canada, and $44.8 million in other territories, for a worldwide total of $108.8 million.

A Man Called Otto grossed $60,000 at four Los Angeles and New York theaters on its opening three-day weekend. It expanded to 637 theaters the following weekend, making $4.2 million and finishing in fourth. In its third weekend the film made $12.7 million after expanding to 3,802 theaters, surpassing its $8 million projections and remaining in fourth.

Critical response 
  Audiences polled by CinemaScore gave the film an average grade of "A" on an A+ to F scale, while PostTrak gave the film an overall positive score of 93%, with 76% saying they would definitely recommend it.

References

External links
 
 
 
 Official screenplay
 Master Class - A Man Called Otto w/ Tom Hanks, Rolf Lassgård, Rita Wilson, 2023 SF Studios video

2022 comedy-drama films
2020s American films
2020s English-language films
American comedy-drama films
American remakes of Swedish films
English-language Swedish films
Columbia Pictures films
Films about suicide
Films about widowhood
Films based on adaptations
Films based on Swedish novels
Films directed by Marc Forster
Films produced by Gary Goetzman
Films produced by Tom Hanks
Films scored by Thomas Newman
Films set in New York (state)
Films set in Pittsburgh
Films shot in New York (state)
Films shot in Pittsburgh
Playtone films